Kevin Austin Jr. (born March 30, 2000) is an American football wide receiver for the Jacksonville Jaguars of the National Football League (NFL). He played college football at Notre Dame.

Early life and high school
Austin grew up in Ft. Lauderdale, Florida. He initially attended Western High School in Davie, Florida before transferring to North Broward Preparatory School after his freshman year. Austin caught 41 passes for 1,021 yards and 13 touchdowns and had 454 rushing yards and six touchdowns on 46 carries in his junior season. He had 35 receptions for 761 yards and 11 touchdowns as a senior. Austin was rated a four-star recruit and committed to play college football at Notre Dame over offers from Clemson, Michigan, Ohio State, and Florida.

College career
Austin played in 11 games as a freshman and caught 90 yards. He was suspended for his entire sophomore season for undisclosed reasons. Austin missed most of his junior season after suffering a fractured foot in preseason training camp and reinjuring it in practice two games into his return. He had one reception for 18 yards in a limited window of good health. As a senior, he had his first full season as a starter. He caught 48 passes for 888 yards and 7 touchdowns. He would declare for the 2022 NFL Draft after the loss in the 2022 Fiesta Bowl against Oklahoma State.

College statistics

Professional career

Austin was signed by the Jacksonville Jaguars after going undrafted in the 2022 NFL Draft. He was waived on August 30 and signed to the practice squad the next day. He signed a reserve/future contract on January 23, 2023.

References

External links
Jacksonville Jaguars bio
 Notre Dame Fighting Irish bio
NFL Prospect bio

2000 births
Living people
Players of American football from Fort Lauderdale, Florida
American football wide receivers
Notre Dame Fighting Irish football players
Jacksonville Jaguars players